Sonja Johnson (born 14 December 1967 in Albany, Western Australia) is an Australian equestrian who won a silver medal at the 2008 Summer Olympics in Beijing as part of the three-day eventing team. The team consisted of Megan Jones, Clayton Fredericks, Lucinda Fredericks and Shane Rose

She grew up on a farm and says she began riding at the age of three to help muster cattle on the property. In 2006, she won the Melbourne 3-Day-Event on the horse Ringwould Jaguar.

References

 Australian Olympic Committee profile

Australian event riders
Australian female equestrians
Equestrians at the 2008 Summer Olympics
Olympic equestrians of Australia
Olympic silver medalists for Australia
Living people
1967 births
Olympic medalists in equestrian
People from Albany, Western Australia
Medalists at the 2008 Summer Olympics